There were two major rail accidents in Turkey in 2018:
 The Çorlu train derailment, on 8 July
 The Ankara train collision, on 13 December